Trinx Bikes (also Trinx Bicycles and Trinx) is a Taiwanese brand of bicycles and related products. As of 2015, it has four major headquarters located in Taiwan, Russia, Iran, and the Philippines. Its products are sold in more than 40 countries.

History 
The company was founded in 1992. It is active in research and development, developing its own carbon fiber plant.

First Iranian UCI team 
Trinx Bikes, together with bike company KTM and the Fastos Group, formed the first Iranian Union Cycliste Internationale (UCI) Cycling Team which officially represents the Iranian Republic in international cycling competitions and other certified races. The team is nominally divided between KTM and Trinx, under cycling coach Harry Hendriks. Hendriks coached two-time Belgian Cross Country champion, Mels Fabrice. The team took part in the Asian Championships in early 2016 for direct qualification for the 2016 Summer Olympics.

Sponsored events

"On Rocky Roads" World Cycling Tour 

Trinx sponsors the "On Rocky Roads" is a worldwide cycling tour. On Rocky Roads started in 2005 in Dublin and through the years cycled through Ireland, Singapore, Malaysia and Australia using Trinx A380 Bicycle's.

Philippines 
In 2015, Trinx held one of the largest cycling events in the Philippines, drawing more than 5,000
participants. The event was held with the Government of the Philippines to support the rebuilding of St. James Church, one of the oldest churches in Bulacan, as well as to sponsor a local festival in the country.

Endorsements

Philippines 

 2013–present: Bernadette Mae Aguirre, Miss Earth Philippines Eco-Tourism 2013
 2015–present: Jennylyn Mercado, Triathlete, FHM Philippines' Sexiest Woman 2015

Recognition

Trinx Worldwide 

 Excellent Enterprise for Overseas Investments, P.R.C.
 China Quality Certification Centre (CQC)
 Guangdong Famous Trademark
 Top 500 Manufacturing Corporations, P.R.C.
 International Standards Office (ISO) 9001:2008
 International Certification Network (IQNet)
 2015: International Forum (iF) Award for Product Design

Trinx Cycling Team 

 2015: 3rd place at the Salcanto Bitlis Mountain Bike Cup held in Turkey
 2015: Champion at the Cross Country (XCO) Tournament of Iranian National Federation

References

Chinese brands
Manufacturing companies based in Guangzhou
Cycle manufacturers of China
Cycle manufacturers of Taiwan